Thomas O'Hara (20 July 1911 – 5 April 1984) was an Irish politician, merchant and auctioneer.
He first stood for election to Dáil Éireann at the 1943 general election, as an independent candidate for the Mayo North constituency, but was not elected. He also unsuccessfully contested the 1944 general election. He was elected to Dáil Éireann at the 1951 general election as a Clann na Talmhan Teachta Dála (TD) for Mayo North. He was re-elected at the 1954 general election, but lost his seat at the 1957 general election.

He unsuccessfully contested the 1961 general election, but was elected as a Fine Gael TD at the 1965 general election. He was re-elected at the 1969 general election for the new Mayo East constituency, but lost his seat at the 1973 general election.

References

1911 births
1984 deaths
Fine Gael TDs
Clann na Talmhan TDs
Members of the 14th Dáil
Members of the 15th Dáil
Members of the 18th Dáil
Members of the 19th Dáil
Politicians from County Mayo